Woman Wise is a 1928 American silent comedy-drama film directed by Albert Ray and starring William Russell, June Collyer and Walter Pidgeon.

Cast
 William Russell as Ne'er-Do-Well  
 June Collyer as Millie Baxter  
 Walter Pidgeon as United States Consul  
 Theodore Kosloff as Abdul Mustapha  
 Ernest Shields as Valet  
 Raoul Paoli as Khurd Chief  
 Duke Kahanamoku as Guard  
 Josephine Borio as Native Girl  
 Carmen Castillo as Native Girl

Preservation status
The film so far as is known is now lost. A foreign archive  may have some parts but is unconfirmed.

See also
1937 Fox vault fire

References

Bibliography
 Solomon, Aubrey. The Fox Film Corporation, 1915-1935. A History and Filmography. McFarland & Co, 2011.

External links

1928 films
Films directed by Albert Ray
American silent feature films
Fox Film films
American black-and-white films
1928 comedy-drama films
1920s English-language films
1920s American films
Silent American comedy-drama films